Pilkington is a multinational glass manufacturing company headquartered in St Helens, United Kingdom.

Pilkington may also refer to:

 Pilkington (ancient township), a former township in Lancashire, England
 Pilkington (Animal Farm), a human character in George Orwell's satirical book Animal Farm
 Pilkington (surname), an English surname
 Pilkington's Group, a British manufacturer of ceramic tiles
 Pilkington's Lancastrian Pottery & Tiles, a British manufacturer of ceramics
 Pilkington Library, the academic library at Loughborough University, England
 Pilkington of Lancashire, a historic English family
 Pilkington XXX F.C., a football club based in Birmingham, England